Josephine Kabick [Jo] (March 27, 1922 – February 8, 1978) was an American female pitcher who played from  through  in the All-American Girls Professional Baseball League. She was born in Detroit, Michigan.

Kabick entered the All-American Girls Professional Baseball League in 1944 with the expansion Milwaukee Chicks, playing for them one year before joining the Grand Rapids Chicks (1945–46), Kenosha Comets (1946) and Peoria Redwings (1947). In her rookie season she posted a 26–19 record with 81 strikeouts in 45 pitching appearances, while leading the league in victories and innings of work (366).

In 1944 the Chicks, managed by Max Carey and supported by Kabick, slugger Merle Keagle, and the speedy Alma Ziegler, finished 30–26 in the first half of the year and dominated the second half (40-19) to collect the best overall record (70-45). They then went on to win the Championship Title, beating Kenosha in seven games.

Although the Chicks captured the AAGPBL championship, they had no local financial backing and could not compete with the American Association Milwaukee Brewers. In fact, the Chicks were forced to play all seven games of the series at Kenosha's Lake Front Stadium because the Brewers were using the Borchert Field in Milwaukee. Due to lack of community support and the vaunted skepticism of journalists, the team moved to Grand Rapids, Michigan, prior to the 1945 season.

But Kabick was unable to repeat her heroics for the 1945 season, while her teammate Connie Wisniewski emerged as one of the most dominant pitchers of the league. After pitching in the two cities, Kabick was dealt to Kenosha during the midseason. She slipped to a combined 16–18 record that year.

In 1946 Kabick improved to 19–19 with Kenosha, a pretty good performance considering her team finished seventh in the eight-team league with a losing record of 42–70, but then she found herself on the move again. This time Kabick went 13–16 for the fifth-place Peoria Redwings (55-57) in 1947, during what turned out to be her last AAGPBL season.

Kabick died in Florida at the age of 55.

Pitching statistics

Sources

All-American Girls Professional Baseball League players
Milwaukee Chicks players
Grand Rapids Chicks players
Kenosha Comets players
Peoria Redwings players
Baseball players from Michigan
1922 births
1978 deaths
20th-century American women
20th-century American people